Rut Holm (1 November 1900 – 4 July 1971) was a Swedish film actress.

Selected filmography
 Servant's Entrance (1932)
 The Southsiders (1932)
 Secret Svensson (1933)
 Augusta's Little Misstep (1933)
 Fridolf in the Lion's Den (1933)
 Saturday Nights (1933)
 Close Relations (1935)
 Sun Over Sweden (1938)
 We at Solglantan (1939)
 Hanna in Society (1940)
 Captured by a Voice (1943)
 The Girls in Smaland (1945)
 The Wedding on Solö (1946)
 Lars Hård (1948)
 Loffe as a Millionaire (1948)
 Carnival Evening (1948)
 Andersson's Kalle (1950)
 When Love Came to the Village (1950)
 The Motor Cavaliers (1950)
 Kalle Karlsson of Jularbo (1952)
 Sju svarta be-hå (1954)
 The Red Horses (1954)
 Far och flyg (1955)
 The Girl in Tails (1956)
 Mother Takes a Vacation (1957)
 We at Väddö (1958)

References

Bibliography 
 Rochelle Wright. The Visible Wall: Jews and Other Ethnic Outsiders in Swedish Film. SIU Press, 1998.

Further reading

External links 
 

1900 births
1971 deaths
Swedish film actresses